Arctomys Peak is a summit in Alberta, Canada.

Arctomys Peak was given the scientific name by Arthur O. Wheeler of a type of marmot native to the region.

References

Two-thousanders of Alberta
Alberta's Rockies